Pneumatic exercise equipment or - machine is a device used for physical exercise. The difference to regular weights or exercise equipment is that the weight stacks, wires and other moving parts are replaced with a pneumatic cylinder whose resistance can be adjusted with air pressure. Modern machines with repetition counters and electrical pressure valves promote precise training of certain muscle groups or a sector of physical functions affecting ones quality of life. Guidelines for health exercise  can also be the purpose of training which can be pursued and monitored by loading a training program to a Smart Card and accomplish exercises guided by machines themselves.

Benefits 
 Switch operated and stable control of resistance
 Lack of inertia
 Higher training effect
 Increased reliability
 Safety (no moving stacks or wires)

History 
Using pneumatic cylinders in exercise machines is a rather new innovation. First prototypes were born during the 80's and 90's.

References 

Exercise equipment